Georgia State Route 26 Loop could refer to:

 Georgia State Route 26 Loop (Savannah): A former loop route that existed in Savannah that became Georgia State Route 21
 Georgia State Route 26 Loop (Savannah Beach): A former loop route that existed in Savannah Beach, the former name of Tybee Island, that became Georgia State Route 26E
 Georgia State Route 26 Loop (Whitemarsh Island–Wilmington Island): A former loop route in Whitemarsh Island and Wilmington Island that became Georgia State Route 367

026 Loop